John McAvoy  is an Iron Man Triathlete and former convicted armed robber.

Biography 
Growing up in a marginalised community, his impoverished family groomed him to lead a life of crime from the time he was a young teenager. He was arrested in 2006 for armed robbery, and sentenced to ten years in prison, two of which were spent at HM Prison Belmarsh. While imprisoned McAvoy began an intense fitness regimen breaking British and World records in the process, and eventually leading him to become a professional athlete. He is currently the only Nike sponsored Ironman Triathlete., he is also supported by Volvo & Cervelo.

Book and other projects 
McAvoy has also written a book titled Redemption, it was co-written by Mark Turley and published in 2016. He has stated in interviews that he gave copies to the police officers who arrested him and also many prison officers, he did this so he could prove that “people can turn their lives around”. He has also featured on Podcasts with Russell Brand & Dr. Rangan Chatterjee and The High Performance Podcast.

References 

British male triathletes
Living people
Year of birth missing (living people)